The 2022 Adur District Council election took place on 5 May 2022 to elect members of Adur District Council. This was on the same day as other local elections. 14 of the 29 seats were up for election.

Background
Adur District Council was created in 1974, and it was first controlled by the Conservatives from 1979 to 1980. The Liberal Party took control of the council, and held it from 1980 to 1999 (Liberal Democrats from 1988). The council then fell under no overall control, until the Conservatives regained control in 2002 (the Liberal Democrats lost representation on the council in 2014). In 2021 election, the Conservatives gained 2 seats with 44.9%, Labour made no gains or losses with 31.1%, the Green Party gained their first council seat with 12.8%, and UKIP lost their 3 seats on the council with 0.4%.

The seats up for election in 2022 year were last elected in 2018. In that election, the Conservatives made no net gains or losses with 44.0%, Labour gained 4 seats with 34.4%, and UKIP lost their 4 seats up for election with 5.3%.

Previous council composition 

Changes:
 September 2021: David Simmons (Conservative) dies; by-election held December 2021
 December 2021: Leila Williams wins by-election for Conservatives

Results

Results by ward
An asterisk indicates an incumbent councillor.

Buckingham

Churchill

Cokeham

Eastbrook

Hillside

Manor

Marine

Mash Barn

Peverel

Southlands

Southwick Green

St. Mary's

St. Nicolas

Widewater

References

Adur
Adur District Council elections